The El Greco Museum (in Spanish: Museo del Greco) is located in Toledo, Spain. It celebrates the mannerist painter El Greco (Domenikos Theotokopoulos, 1541–1614), who spent much of his life in Toledo, having been born in Fodele, Crete.

The house and museum

The museum first opened in 1911 and is located in the Jewish Quarter of Toledo. It consists of two buildings, a 16th-century house with a courtyard and an early 20th century building forming the museum, together with a garden. The house recreates the home of El Greco, which no longer exists. The museum houses many artworks by El Greco, especially from his late period. There are also paintings by other 17th-century Spanish artists, as well as furniture from the period and pottery from Talavera de la Reina in the Province of Toledo.

Collection

Apostalado by El Greco

A complete series of 13 paintings portraying Christ and his disciples originally produced between 1610 and 1614 by El Greco and his workshop for the Hospital de Santiago in Toledo. The series was conceived and executed  as a single project, with Christ looking directly out of the picture, six of the disciples looking to the left and six to the right. The disciples represent his 12 original followers, except that the disgraced Judas Iscariot is replaced by Saint Paul. All the works are oil on canvas with a size of 97 x 77 cm. 

Other works
In addition to other works by El Greco the museum has paintings by various Spanish artists.

See also
 Museum of El Greco, Fodele, Crete (birthplace of El Greco)
 List of paintings by El Greco
 List of single-artist museums

References

External links
 Museum website
Photos and history in Maravillas Ocultas de España
El Greco Museum, Toledo within Google Arts & Culture

Art museums and galleries in Spain
Museum
Biographical museums in Spain
Museums in Toledo, Spain
Art museums established in 1911
1911 establishments in Spain
Tourist attractions in Toledo, Spain
Greco, El